The A614 is a main road in England running through the counties of Nottinghamshire, South Yorkshire and the East Riding of Yorkshire.

Route
Beginning at Redhill, the northernmost point in the Nottingham suburb of Arnold in Nottinghamshire,  the road meets the A60 and A6097 at Redhill roundabout then passes Bilsthorpe. At Rufford there is a Center Parcs resort and Rufford Country Park. This is near to Edwinstowe, famed for its connections with Robin Hood. The road meets several other roads on a small roundabout at Ollerton with fuel stations and fast food outlets. 

The road passes Clumber Park and goes past the entrance to the former Army Proteus training camp. The road passes over the River Poulter. At Apleyhead Wood, the road meets the A1 and A57. Major works were started on the Apleyhead junction in 2006 to convert the roundabout into a dual-grade junction (GSJ). This work was completed on 20 May 2008.

At junction 34 of the A1(M) at Blyth, next to a large Moto service station, the road runs north to the settlement of Bawtry, passing to the south of a nearby colliery at Harworth. At Bawtry the road meets the A638, a Roman road which heads into Doncaster, passing under the East Coast Main Line here. At Finningley, the road passes around the runway of Robin Hood Airport Doncaster Sheffield, the former RAF Finningley. The road has a level crossing with the Doncaster-Lincoln railway line and the River Torne is crossed. Near Hatfield Woodhouse, the road passes a prison which used to be RAF Lindholme, used by RAF Bomber Command. The road meets the M180 and A18 at a roundabout at Thorne, the former terminus of the A18(M), the M18 at junction 6, follows the River Don for  then crosses it where the river becomes the Dutch River.

From Goole, the road continues in a north-easterly direction, crosses the M62 and passes over the River Ouse on the iron-girder Boothferry Bridge before intersecting with the M62 at junction 36.

From here, the road becomes a trunk road running through the settlements of Howden, Holme-on-Spalding-Moor, Driffield, ending on the Yorkshire coast at Bridlington, where it joins the A165.

History

Former route in Nottinghamshire
The road used to continue south from the junction with the A60, next to the Little Chef, and overlap the A60. The north-west section of the Nottingham western bypass, up to the A52 junction, near the Queen's Medical Centre (before the Clifton Boulevard was built) was the A614 for some time and is now the A6514. Before renumbering of Clifton Boulevard to the A52, concurrent with the numbering of the A614 to A6514, the section from the A52 to A606 was also A614.

Former route in the East Riding of Yorkshire
Originally, the A614 went from Thorne via Snaith to Selby. The current section from Goole through Rawcliffe was the A161 (from Gainsborough). From Goole to Holme-on-Spalding Moor, it was the A1041. From here through Market Weighton, to Driffield, it was the A163. From here to Bridlington, it used to be the A166 (which is the road from York). More recently, it finished at Holme-on-Spalding-Moor, then what is now the A614, carried on north as the A163 (from Selby), then as the A164 (from Beverley) just before Driffield.

Fatal accident in February 2009
On Friday, 13 February 2009 just after 23:00 six people were killed in a head-on collision on the road in Nottinghamshire between the Bilsthorpe crossroads and the Eakring turn-off. The victims were four teenagers in one car, and an elderly couple in the other.

The cause of the accident was concluded by the coroner as to have happened as a result of "inappropriate overtaking" by the driver of the teenagers' car.

References

External links

 Improvements to Apleyhead junction.
 SABRE
 A Guide to Goole
 Wikinews: Six killed in UK car crash

Roads in England
Roads in Yorkshire
Transport in the East Riding of Yorkshire
Transport in Nottinghamshire
Transport in South Yorkshire